Lars "Lasse" Nils Berghagen (born 13 May 1945) is a Swedish singer, songwriter and actor.

Berghagen is a well known singer-songwriter in Sweden. He released his first record in 1965, aged just 19. Four years later, in 1969, he released the single Teddybjörnen Fredriksson ("The Teddybear Fredriksson"), which has become a classic. Other hits include Sträck ut din hand, En kväll i juni and Stockholm i mitt hjärta.

Berghagen won the Swedish 1975 Melodifestivalen with the song Jennie, Jennie. He also participated in Melodifestivalen 1974 with the song Min kärlekssång till dig ("My Lovesong For You"), taking second place (after ABBA).

He hosted the popular summer TV show Allsång på Skansen (Singalong at Skansen) from 1994 to 2003. During his time as host the show increased its ratings from 600,000 to 2,000,000 viewers, which by Swedish standards is considered an impressive rating (Sweden has approximately 10,000,000 inhabitants).

He was married to singer Barbro "Lill-Babs" Svensson from 1965 to 1968. He is the father of actress and TV personality Malin Berghagen, and the ex father-in-law of Tommy Nilsson.

Berghagen also holds the official world record for hitting a golf ball the longest distance, from one country, through another and into a third. This was done at Treriksröset, when he hit a golf ball from Norway, through Sweden, and into Finland.

He was awarded the Illis quorum by the government of Sweden in 2003.

Discography
1969 Lars Berghagen
1972 Min värld i toner
1973 Ding Dong
1975 Jennie, Jennie
1975 Hålligång på krogen
1976 Jag ville bli någon
1977 Tacka vet jag logdans
1978 Det är jul
1980 Tillsammans igen
1983 Dagboksblad
1988 Nära naturen
1991 På begäran
1995 Sträck ut din hand
1997 Inte bara drömmar
1999 Till sommaren och dig
2001 Som en blänkande silvertråd
2001 Det bästa med Lasse Berghagen (4-disc box)
2002 Stockholm, mina drömmars stad
2003 Lasses favoriter from "Allsång på Skansen" (3-disc box)
2004 Lars Berghagen 20 klassiker
2004 Jul i vårt hus
2009 Lasse Berghagen och Sveriges Radios Symfoniorkester
2011 Bara lite längtan

Filmography
1972: Firmafesten
1978: Dante akta're för Hajen
1995: Bert – den siste oskulden

References and sources

Swedish Media Database
Official website

1945 births
Living people
Singers from Stockholm
Swedish songwriters
20th-century Swedish male singers
Eurovision Song Contest entrants of 1975
Eurovision Song Contest entrants for Sweden
Melodifestivalen contestants
Melodifestivalen winners
Swedish television personalities
Swedish male actors
21st-century Swedish male singers
Recipients of the Illis quorum